Peter Ankerson (January 21, 1874 – February 12, 1952) was an American farmer from Oconto, Wisconsin who served two terms as a Republican member of the Wisconsin State Assembly, as well as holding various local offices. He was active in the American Society of Equity.

References 

Leaders of the American Society of Equity
Danish emigrants to the United States
1874 births
1952 deaths
Republican Party members of the Wisconsin State Assembly